Murray Balagus (born October 15, 1929  in Winnipeg, Manitoba ) was a Canadian ice hockey centreman who played on six Manitoba Senior Hockey Championship teams.

Awards and achievements
“Honoured Member” of the Manitoba Hockey Hall of Fame

External links

Murray Balagus's biography at Manitoba Hockey Hall of Fame

Ice hockey people from Manitoba
1929 births
Living people
Canadian ice hockey centres